General Cathcart may refer to:

Alan Cathcart, 6th Earl Cathcart (1919–1999), British Army major general
Charles Cathcart, 2nd Earl Cathcart (1783–1859), British Army general
Charles Cathcart, 8th Lord Cathcart (1686–1740), British Army major general
Charles Cathcart, 9th Lord Cathcart (1721–1776), British Army lieutenant general
George Cathcart (1794–1854), British Army major general
William Cathcart, 1st Earl Cathcart (1755–1843), British Army general